NSAD may refer to:

 Northern Saskatchewan Administration District (NSAD), Saskatchewan, Canada
 Nationalsozialistischer Arbeitsdienst (NSAD) of Nazi Germany, the predecessor to the Reichsarbeitsdienst (RAD): Reich Labour Service
 Nuclear Safety Analysis Division (NSAD), part of the Atomic Energy Regulatory Board of India
 National Student-Athlete Day (April 6), a celebration promoted by National Consortium for Academics and Sports

See also

 NSAID
 
 Sad (disambiguation)